Deep Tracts of Hell is the second studio album by the Norwegian black metal band Aura Noir.

Track listing
"Deep Tracts of Hell" – 1:57
"Released Damnation" – 4:22
"Swarm of Vultures" – 2:45
"Blood Unity" – 4:47
"Slasher" – 3:29
"Purification of Hell" – 2:45
"The Spiral Scar" – 4:26
"The Beautiful, Darkest Path" – 4:31
"Broth of Oblivion" – 4:40
"To Wear the Mark" – 3:26

Personnel

Aura Noir 
Aggressor − guitars, bass, drums, vocals
Apollyon − guitars, bass, drums, vocals
Blasphemer − guitar

Production and Engineering 
Recorded and mixed at Jester Studio in Oslo, Norway in July 1998
Mastered at Strype Audio in Oslo, Norway
Distributed by Rough Trade Distribution
Artwork [Logo By] – Lise Myhre
Engineer – Garm Backbone, Knut Magne Valle
Layout – TurboNatas Tsagabbar
Photography By [Photographic Artworks And Portraits] – Håkon Harris

External links 
Metallum Archives
Discogs.com

1998 albums
Aura Noir albums